Barker railway station was the only intermediate station on the Kew railway line in Melbourne, Australia. It was opened on 19 December 1887 and closed with the line on 13 May 1957. The station was located between Barkers Road and Hawthorn Grove and has since been demolished.

References

Disused railway stations in Melbourne
Railway stations in Australia opened in 1887
Railway stations closed in 1952